Anderl (Andreas) Oxner von Rinn, also known as Andreas Oxner, (c. 1459 – 12 July 1462) is a folk saint of the Roman Catholic Church. A later writer alleged that the three-year-old boy had been ritually murdered by the Jews in the village of Rinn (Northern Tyrol, currently part of Austria). The story is an example of a Blood libel common in medieval Europe.

Initial accusations
Andrew was said to have been the child of day laborers Simon and Maria Oxner. After his father's death, the mother allegedly entrusted the child to his uncle Johann Meyer, an innkeeper. On 12 July 1462, Andrew disappeared, and his mother found his body hanging from a tree in a nearby forest. The uncle claimed that he had sold the child to some traveling merchants. The child's body was buried in a cemetery of Ampass without any investigation.

In 1619, Hyppolyte Guarinoni allegedly heard a story about a little boy buried in Rinn who had been murdered by Jews, and dreamt that his year of death was 1462. Research suggests that a child named Andreas Oxner perhaps never existed. Nonetheless, celebrations of the cult began in 1621 and, by the late 17th century, they occurred in all the Tyrol region.

Around 1677–85, the inhabitants of Rinn solemnly transferred Andrew's body to Rinn, imitating the cult of Simon of Trent. The alleged scene of the crime, known as the "Judenstein" (or Jews' Stone), became a place of pilgrimage and locus of antisemitism in area.

Tale 
The tale of the Anderl's ritual murder, known as Der Judenstein (The Jews' Stone), is largely part of a Tyrolian oral tradition and only a few written versions exist. It was recorded by the Grimm Brothers in Deutsche Sagen (1816/1818).

Veneration 
In 1752, Pope Benedict XIV beatified Anderl, but in 1755 refused to canonize him and stated that the Roman Church did not formally venerate him.

Popular theatrical performances based on the writings of Guarinoni were performed until 1954 and facilitated the spread of the blood libel legend. The Brothers Grimm revived the tale in 1816 when they published the first volume of their German legends. In 1893, a book appeared, Four Tyrolian Child Victims of Hassidic Fanaticism by Viennese priest Josef Deckert.

The cult of Anderl von Rinn persisted in Austria until the 1990s. In 1985, Bishop of Innsbruck Reinhold Stecher ordered the body transferred from the church to the churchyard of Judenstein, and forbade his cult in 1994. Some ultra-conservative Christians still make a procession to his grave every year.

See also
See also the articles of other children whose deaths in medieval times gave rise to the persecution of the Jews:

Harold of Gloucester
Little Saint Hugh of Lincoln
Robert of Bury
Simon of Trent
Werner of Oberwesel
William of Norwich
Gabriel of Białystok

References

Further reading 

Rainer Erb: Es hat nie einen jüdischen Ritualmord gegeben. Konflikte um die Abschaffung der Verehrung des Andreas von Rinn. Wien 1989.
Bernhard Fresacher: Anderl von Rinn. Ritualmordkult und Neuorientierung in Judenstein 1945–1995. Innsbruck und Wien 1998. 
Andreas Maislinger und Günther Pallaver: « Antisemitismus ohne Juden - Das Beispiel Tirol ». In: Wolfgang Plat (Hg.), Voll Leben und voll Tod ist diese Erde. Bilder aus der Geschichte der Jüdischen Österreicher. Herold Verlag, Wien 1988. 
: Anna und das Anderle. Eine Recherche. Frankfurt am Main 1995. 
Richard Utz: "Remembering Ritual Murder: The Anti-Semitic Blood Accusation Narrative in Medieval and Contemporary Cultural Memory." In Genre and Ritual: The Cultural Heritage of Medieval Rituals. Ed. Eyolf Østrem. Copenhagen: Museum Tusculanum Press/University of Copenhagen, 2005. Pp. 145–62.

External links
Fordham University: The Jesuit University of New York;  Medieval Sourcebook: A Blood Libel Cult: Anderln von Rinn d. 1462

1450s births
1462 deaths
15th-century Austrian people
15th-century Christian saints
Murdered Austrian children
Blood libel
Antisemitism in Austria
Austrian Roman Catholic saints
German Roman Catholic saints
Roman Catholic child saints
Christian antisemitism in the Middle Ages
Folk saints
People from Innsbruck-Land District
Year of birth uncertain
Medieval Austrian saints
Religious controversies in Austria